Oron is a coastal city and Local Government Area in Akwa Ibom State, Nigeria. It is home to the Maritime Academy of Nigeria and the Oron Museum.

It has an area of 70 km and a population of 156,461 at the 2006 census.

The postal code of the area is 523.

History

Oron became a Division in August 1970 and in 1976, was made a Local Government Area. However, following the local government creation exercise of the federal government in 1989, Oron was split into 3 Local Government Areas of Mbo, Akwa Ibom Oron, Akwa Ibom and Okobo, Akwa Ibom. Again in September 1991, Urue-Offong/Oruko Local Government Area was carved out of Oron Local Government Area. Finally in December 1996, Udung Uko Local Government Area was further carved out of Oron.

Clan and settlement
Oron Town as it is popularly known is made up of four (4) out of the Nine (9) Oron people clans (Afaha) which are.

Afaha Okpo Clan  also known as Afaha Okpo District includes

Esin Ufot
Esuk Oro
Eyo Ekung Inyang
Eyo Obiosio
Udung Esin
Udung Ulo
Udung Usotia
Udung Ekung
Ikwita

Ibighi Clan also known as Uya Oro District includes

Uya Oro
Eyo-Atta
Eyo-Esu
Eyo-Ifang
Eyo-Odiong
Eyo-Okpo
Eyo-Uya
Udung Okwong
Udung Uwe

Afaha Ukwong Clan which is today known as Eyo Abasi District includes

Eyo Abasi
Akai-Ikon
Udung Ekung
Udung Ekung II
Udung Osin
Udung Uko
Uko Ukwong
Uko Uyokim.

Afaha Ubodung Clan now known as Eyotong District comprises

Eyotong
Eyo-Esang-Obisung
Eyo-Esio-Uwak
Eyo-Okpo-Oyo
Eyo-Orukra-Usuyak
Eyo-Otong-Uwe
Eyo-Oyete
Udung Obisung.

Geography
Oron is in the tropical region and has a uniformly high temperature all the year round. The two main seasons are the dry which spans between October and April and wet season which starts around May and ends in September. There are also two prevailing winds – the South-West onshore winds which brings heavy rains and the North- East trade winds blowing across the Sahara Desert, which brings in the dry season.

Natural resources
The region is extremely fertile and is known for its topographical Oil Palm Belt, tropical rainforest, swamps, and beaches. The mangrove forests also provide timber and raw materials for medicinal purposes. There are also deposits of solid minerals such as iron, free silica or glass sand and gravel. Seafoods such as crayfish, snipers, oyster and periwinkle abound richly.
Oron is also rich in oil and natural gas. Most of its oil reserves are off-shore with large amounts of untapped natural gas.

See also
 Oron people
 Urue-Offong/Oruko
 Mbo, Akwa Ibom
 Okobo, Akwa Ibom
 Udung Uko
 Obolo, Akwa Ibom
 Akwa Ibom State

References

Oron people
Cities in Akwa Ibom State
Places in Oron Nation
Local Government Areas in Akwa Ibom State